Walter Phillips may refer to:

 Walter J. Phillips (1884–1963), American artist
 Walter P. Phillips (1846–1920), American inventor
 Walter Alison Phillips (1864–1950), British historian
 Walter Phillips (cricketer) (1881–1948), English cricketer
 Walter Phillips (bowls), English lawn bowler
 Walter Shelley Phillips, self-educated and self-trained naturalist, artist and author
 Wally Phillips (1925–2008), American radio personality
 Wal Phillips, English motorcycle speedway rider

See also
 Walter Phillips Gallery, Banff, Alberta